Sir Thomas Brock  (1 March 184722 August 1922) was an English sculptor and medallist, notable for the creation of several large public sculptures and monuments in Britain and abroad in the late nineteenth and early twentieth centuries.
 His most famous work is the Victoria Memorial in front of Buckingham Palace, London. Other commissions included the redesign of the effigy of Queen Victoria on British coinage, the massive bronze equestrian statue of Edward, the Black Prince, in City Square, Leeds and the completion of the statue of Prince Albert on the Albert Memorial.

Biography
Brock was born on 1 March 1847 in Worcester. He was the only son of a painter and decorator and attended the Government School of Design in Worcester, after which he undertook an apprenticeship in modelling at the Worcester Royal Porcelain Works. In 1866 he became a pupil of the sculptor John Henry Foley and also enrolled in the Royal Academy Schools, where he won a gold medal for sculpture in 1869. He met and befriended Frederic, Lord Leighton, whose emphasis on realism and naturalism in sculpture led Brock to become part of the New Sculpture movement and to develop his talent for sympathetic and realistic portraiture.
After Foley's sudden death in 1874, Brock finished several of his commissions, including the monument to Daniel O'Connell in Dublin and a large bronze equestrian statue of Lord Canning for Kolkata. It was his completion of Foley's statue of Prince Albert for the Albert Memorial which first brought Brock to prominence and secured his position as an establishment sculptor.

Brock was elected an associate of the Royal Academy in 1883 and became a full member in 1891. He was a founding member, and the first president, of the Society of British Sculptors. 

Brock's group The Moment of Peril (now in the garden of Leighton House) was followed by The Genius of Poetry, at the Carlsberg Brewery in Copenhagen. A plaster model for Eve was shown at the Royal Academy in 1898; a marble version (1900) is in the collection of the Tate and Brock also cast some smaller bronze replicas and other imaginative works that mark his development.  His portrait works include busts, such as those of Lord Leighton and Queen Victoria, statues, such as Sir Richard Owen and Henry Philpott, bishop of Worcester, and sepulchral monuments such as that of Lord Leighton in St Paul's Cathedral.

Brock made statues of Victoria to celebrate her golden and diamond jubilees and also designed the depiction of her "veiled" or "widowed" head, used on all gold, silver and bronze coinage between 1893 and 1901.

In 1901 Brock won the commission to make a colossal equestrian statue of Edward the Black Prince for Leeds City Square. The same year, he was given perhaps his most significant commission, the vast multi-figure Imperial Memorial to Queen Victoria, to be erected in front of Buckingham Palace. The unveiling of this memorial took place on 16 May 1911, and according to legend King George V was so moved by the excellence of the memorial that he called for a sword and knighted Brock on the spot. In any event, it was on the same day that the Lord Chamberlain’s Office notified The London Gazette that the king had ordered that Brock be appointed a Knight Commander of the Order of the Bath.

From 1914 to 1919 Brock returned to the post of president of the Society of British Sculptors. 

Brock married in 1869 and had eight children. He died in London on 22 August 1922 and is buried at Mayfield, East Sussex.

Public monuments

1875–1889

1890–1899

1900–1909

1910–1919

1920 and later

Other works
 Equestrian bronze A Moment of Peril (1880) now in the collection of Tate Britain.
 Statue of Thomas Gainsborough at the Royal Academy in Burlington House, London.
 Statue of Queen Victoria, Agra, 1905, removed to storage in Mathura after the 1947 independence of India. The statue was originally on a pedestal with bronze figures of Truth and Justice at the base and located on a marble platform in an ornamental lake. The supporting figures are now missing.
 Bronze statue of Queen Victoria, erected 1904 at Cawnpore and now in the Uttar Pradesh State Museum, Lucknow. Thought to be a cast of the design Brock used for his statues of the Queen at Agra, Hove, Brisbane and Carlise.
 Bust of Henry Lee, in the hall of the Royal College of Surgeons
 Busts of Henry W. Longfellow at Grand Pre, Nova Scotia
 Busts of Joseph Lister, Michael Faraday and Frederic Leighton in the collection of the National Portrait Gallery in London.
 Marble statue on pedestal of Sorabjee Shapurjee Bengallee, 1898, south-east corner of the Oval, Fort, Mumbai
 Marble bust of Sir Cowasjee Jehangir, 1915, Jehangir Public Hall, India
 Statue of George Clarke, 1st Baron Sydenham of Combe, erected 1919, inside entrance to Science Institute College, Mumbai
 Marble bust for India of Darasha Ruttonjee Chichgur, 1903, current location unknown
 Marble seated statue on a pedestal of Dinshaw Maneckji Petit, shown at the Royal Academy in 1916 and subsequently erected near the Victoria Terminus in Mumbai

See also
List of statues of Queen Victoria (13 of the entries are by Brock)

References

Further reading

External links

1847 births
1922 deaths

19th-century English male artists
20th-century English male artists
19th-century English sculptors
20th-century English sculptors
Alumni of the Royal Academy Schools
Artists from Worcester, England
Artists' Rifles soldiers
English male sculptors
Knights Commander of the Order of the Bath
Royal Academicians